Génin is a French surname. Notable people with the surname include:

 René Génin (1890-1967), French stage and film actor
 René Génin (soldier)
 Jacques Génin, French chocolatier
 Paul Agricole Génin, flautist in Paris
 Pierre Génin, flautist who emigrated to the United Kingdom
 Lucien Génin, painter

References

French-language surnames